William Archibald Grigg (15 February 1895 – 15 October 1983) was an Australian rules footballer who played for the Melbourne Football Club in the Victorian Football League (VFL).

Notes

External links 
		
 

1895 births
1983 deaths
Australian rules footballers from Victoria (Australia)
Melbourne Football Club players